UNESCO's City of Crafts and Folk Arts project is part of the wider Creative Cities Network, founded in 2004, which designates cities worldwide that have made unique contributions to the field of crafts and folk arts.

The current designated Cities of Crafts and Folk Arts of UNESCO are:

See also 

 Creative Cities Network
 City of Film
 City of Gastronomy
 City of Literature
 City of Music (UNESCO)
 Design Cities (UNESCO)

References

UNESCO
Lists of cities
Crafts
Folk arts